Keystone is an unincorporated community and a census-designated place (CDP) located in and governed by Summit County, Colorado, United States. The CDP is a part of the Breckenridge, CO Micropolitan Statistical Area. The population of the Keystone CDP was 1,079 at the United States Census 2010. The Dillon post office  serves Keystone postal addresses. The Keystone CDP includes the Keystone Resort and Keystone village.

Geography

Demographics

Keystone Resort
Keystone Resort was originally constructed in the 1970s by the Ralston Purina Company. It is now owned by Vail Resorts. The Keystone Resort ski area occupies 3 separate mountains: Dercum Mountain, North Peak, and The Outback.  Recent expansion of terrain and services offers snowcat skiing in Independence Bowl, Bergman Bowl, Erickson Bowl, in addition to the existing North Bowl and South Bowl on Wapiti Peak.   The resort has many summer and winter outdoor activities.  The winter activities include alpine skiing, snowboarding, tubing, ice-skating, cross-country skiing, horse-drawn sleigh ride dinners, and snowmobiling.  The summer activities include hiking, mountain biking, fishing, trail running, golf on two championship courses, and paddle boating on Keystone Lake. 

The Keystone ski area has:
 
  vertical
 Base elevation: 
 Summit elevation: 
 131 trails
 Degree of difficulty percentages for trails: Easiest-14 percent, More Difficult-29 percent, Most Difficult-57 percent
 20 Lifts including 2 gondolas, 2 express six-pack and 4 high speed quads.
 The only Night skiing in the area.

Keystone is only a short drive from other resorts in Summit County - about 10 minutes to Arapaho Basin, 20 minutes to Breckenridge, and 20 minutes to Copper Mountain.

See also

Outline of Colorado
Index of Colorado-related articles
State of Colorado
Colorado cities and towns
Colorado census designated places
Colorado counties
Colorado metropolitan areas
Silverthorne, CO Micropolitan Statistical Area
White River National Forest
Keystone Resort

References

External links

Keystone, Colorado
Keystone @ Colorado.com
Keystone @ UncoverColorado.com
Keystone @ SummitCove.com
Keystone Resort website
Summit County website
White River National Forest website

Census-designated places in Summit County, Colorado
Census-designated places in Colorado